Blessid Union of Souls is the second studio album by the American alternative rock band Blessid Union of Souls, released on May 20, 1997 (see 1997 in music) on Capitol Records. Two singles were released from the album—"I Wanna Be There" and "Light in Your Eyes".

Track listing
All songs written by Eliot Sloan, Jeff Pence and EMOSIA except as indicated.

 "I Wanna Be There" (Sloan, Pence, EMOSIA, Eddie Hedges) — 4:30
 "Jelly" — 4:46
 "Light in Your Eyes" (Tommy Sims, Sloan) — 4:16
 "Scenes from a Coffee House (You'll Always Be Mine)" — 4:20
 "Hold Her Closer" — 3:23
 "My Friend" (EMOSIA, Sloan, Pence, C. P. Roth) — 4:10
 "Where We Were Before" (Sloan, Pence, EMOSIA, Eddie Pomeroy) — 3:24
 "It's Your Day (Bronson's Song)" (Sloan, Roth, EMOSIA) — 4:39
 "Humble Star" (Sloan, EMOSIA, Roth) — 3:29
 "When She Comes" — 3:20
 "Peace and Love" (Shelly Peiken, Sloan, Pence, EMOSIA) — 4:20

Notes

External links
 Website info

1997 albums
Capitol Records albums
Blessid Union of Souls albums